Lymantria detersa is a moth of the family Erebidae first described by Francis Walker in 1865. It is found in India.

The caterpillar feeds on Casuarina equisetifolia.

One subspecies, Lymantria detersa costalis Walker, 1865, is recognized.

References

Lymantria
Moths of Asia
Moths described in 1865